Meadowcroft may refer to:

Meadowcroft Rockshelter, an archaeological site in Pennsylvania, United States, and the associated Meadowcroft Village museum
The estate now called the John Ellis Roosevelt Estate
A ward of Aylesbury where Quarrendon Estate is located
Meadowcroft, the original title of the British soap opera Brookside

People with surname Meadowcroft
Harold Meadowcroft (1889–1916), English footballer
Jim Meadowcroft (1946-2015), British snooker player
Michael Meadowcroft (born 1942), British politician
Stan Meadowcroft, fictional character in British television sitcom dinnerladies
William Henry Meadowcroft secretary and biographer of Thomas Edison